The 1967–68 IHL season was the 23rd season of the International Hockey League, a North American minor professional league. Seven teams participated in the regular season, and the Muskegon Mohawks won the Turner Cup.

Regular season

Turner Cup-playoffs

External links
 Season 1967/68 on hockeydb.com

IHL
International Hockey League (1945–2001) seasons